Shannon McSheffrey FRHS is professor of history at Concordia University and a specialist in late medieval England.

Selected publications
 Gender and Heresy: Women and Men in Lollard Communities, 1420-1530 (University of Pennsylvania Press, 1995)
 Love and Marriage in Late Medieval London (Medieval Institute Publications, 1995)
 Lollards of Coventry 1486-1522 (co-authored with Norman Tanner), Camden Fifth Series, vol. 23 (Cambridge University Press, 2003)
 Marriage, Sex, and Civic Culture in Late Medieval London (University of Pennsylvania Press, 2006)
 Seeking Sanctuary: Law, Mitigation, and Politics in English Courts, 1400-1550 (Oxford University Press, 2017)

References

External links 
Shannon McSheffrey | Concordia University (Canada) - Academia.edu
Shannon McSheffrey

Living people
Year of birth missing (living people)
Medievalists
Academic staff of Concordia University
Fellows of the Royal Historical Society
Women historians